Robert Oliphant may refer to:

 Rob Oliphant (born 1956), Canadian politician and United Church minister
 Robert Oliphant (rugby union) (c. 1867–1956), New Zealand rugby union player